Sanjeewa (Sinhala: සංජීව) is a Sinhalese name that may refer to the following notable people:
Given name
Sanjeewa Hulangamuwa (1955–2013), Sri Lankan politician
Sanjeewa Munasinghe, Sri Lankan military physician
Sanjeewa Pushpakumara (born 1977), Sri Lankan film director and producer
Sanjeewa Silva (born 1975), Sri Lankan cricketer
Sanjeewa Weerasinghe (born 1968), Sri Lankan cricketer

Surname
Buddika Sanjeewa (born 1987), Sri Lankan cricketer
Chaturan Sanjeewa (born 1980), Sri Lankan cricketer
Chathuranga Sanjeewa, Sri Lankan football midfielder
Dilshan Sanjeewa, Sri Lankan cricketer
Mahesh Sanjeewa (born 1998), Sri Lankan cricketer
Nuwan Sanjeewa (born 1978), Sri Lankan cricketer
Thissa Sanjeewa (born 1992), Sri Lankan cricketer

Sinhalese masculine given names
Sinhalese surnames